Clelia clelia, commonly known as the black mussurana or windward cribo, is a species of snake in the family Colubridae. The species is native to the New World.

Etymology
The subspecific name, groomei, is in honor of Grenadian zoologist John R. Groome.

Names
It is called doi or duma in the Kwaza language of Rondônia, Brazil.

Geographic range
Clelia clelia is found in Central America, South America, and the Lesser Antilles (including the island of Trinidad).

Description
Clelia clelia is a large snake. Dorsally, adults are uniform black, gray, or olive-gray. Ventrally, adults are yellowish white. Juveniles are pale brown or red, with a black head and a yellow collar.

Diet
Clelia clelia preys almost exclusively on snakes, especially venomous snakes of the genera Bothriechis, Bothrops, Crotalus, Lachesis, Micrurus, and Porthidium. Despite being primarily ophiophagous, Clelia clelia also include in their diet: lizards, snake eggs, opossums, rodents, birds, small mammals, and snails.

Reproduction
Clelia clelia is oviparous.

Subspecies
Clelia clelia has two subspecies, including the nominotypical subspecies, which are recognized as being valid.
Clelia clelia clelia 
Clelia clelia groomei 

Nota bene: A binomial authority or trinomial authority in parentheses indicates that the species or subspecies was originally described in a genus other than Clelia.

References

Further reading
Daudin FM (1803). Histoire Naturelle, Générale et Particulière des Reptiles ... Tome sixième [Volume 6]. Paris: F. Dufart. 447 pp. (Coluber clelia, new species, p. 330). (in French).
Schwartz A, Thomas R (1975). A Check-list of West Indian Amphibians and Reptiles. Carnegie Museum of Natural History Special Publication No. 1. Pittsburgh, Pennsylvania: Carnegie Museum of Natural History. 216 pp. (Clelia clelia, pp. 180–181).

Mussuranas
Clelia
Snakes of Central America
Snakes of South America
Reptiles of Mexico
Reptiles described in 1803